Plateau Mahafaly will be the 24th region of Madagascar. It will be created by dividing the former region of Atsimo-Andrefana. Its capital is Ampanihy Ouest.

Administrative divisions
Plateau Mahafaly will cover three districts, 59 communes and 762 fokontany (villages) with a population of 951653 inhabitants:
 Ampanihy Ouest (district)
 Benenitra (district)
 Betioky-Atsimo (district)

References

Atsimo-Andrefana
Regions of Madagascar